Sharon McGrady (born 14 March 1993) is an Australian rugby league footballer who played for the Sydney Roosters in the NRL Women's Premiership. 

Background
Born in Goondiwindi, Queensland, McGrady first played rugby league for the Toomelah Tigers in 2010. Her father, Jason, and uncle, Ewan, were both professional rugby league players.

Playing career
On 19 July 2014, McGrady made her debut for New South Wales in a 10–26 loss to Queensland.

In 2018 and 2019, McGrady played for the South Sydney Rabbitohs in the NSWRL Women's Premiership. Later in 2018, McGrady joined the Sydney Roosters NRL Women's Premiership team. 

In Round 2 of the 2018 NRL Women's season, she made her debut for the Roosters in their 4–14 loss to the Brisbane Broncos. She dislocated her shoulder during the match and missed the rest of the season.

References

External links
South Sydney Rabbitohs profile

1993 births
Living people
People from the Darling Downs
Indigenous Australian rugby league players
Australian female rugby league players
Rugby league fullbacks
Rugby league wingers
Rugby league halfbacks
Sydney Roosters (NRLW) players